CBH may refer to:
 CBH, the IATA code for Boudghene Ben Ali Lotfi Airport in Béchar, Algeria
 CBH-FM, a CBC Radio 2 station in Halifax, Nova Scotia
 CBH Group, grain-handling co-operative
 Cambridge Heath railway station, England; National Rail station code CBH
 Cape Breton Highlanders, a Canadian militia infantry regiment
 Catherine Booth Hospital, in Kanyakumari, Tamil Nadu, India
 Cellulase, a class of enzymes
 Chicago Blackhawks, professional ice hockey team
 Children's Bible Hour (CBH Ministries), a Christian media organization
Cocoa bean husk, the shell which is removed to extract the nib used to make cocoa powder and chocolate.
 Commerce Bancorp, a bank holding company
 Complete Heart Block, Third degree heart block, medical
 Cognitive Behavioural Hypnotherapy (CBH), an alternative curative healing method
 Classical Biblical Hebrew (CBH) pre-exilic Hebrew language